The following lists events that happened in 2012 in Lebanon.

Incumbents
President: Michel Suleiman 
Prime Minister: Najib Mikati

Events

February
 11 February – At least three people are killed and several wounded in Tripoli, in clashes between supporters and opponents of Syrian president Bashar al-Assad.

October
 3 October – Several blasts strike an arms stockpile in the Hezbollah-controlled Bekaa Valley.

Deaths
1 February – Nassib Lahoud, politician (born 1944)

References

 
Lebanon
2010s in Lebanon
Years of the 21st century in Lebanon
Lebanon